Hermogenes of Tarsus was a Greek rhetorician, surnamed The Polisher. He flourished in the reign of Marcus Aurelius (AD 161–180).

Life and work

His precocious ability secured him a public appointment as teacher of his art while he was only a boy, attracting the note of the emperor Marcus Aurelius himself; but at the age of twenty-five his faculties gave way, and he spent the remainder of his long life in a state of intellectual impotence.
According to his biographer Philostratus, he did not suffer from a disease, but Philostratus of Lemnos did no longer excel as public speaker and continued in this pitiable state until dying at an advanced age. Allegedly, Antiochus used to taunt him: "Lo, here is one who was an old man among boys and now among the old is but a boy." The Suda records a rumor that after his death his heart was found to be enormous and covered in hair.

During his early years, however, he had composed a series of rhetorical treatises, which became very popular textbooks in Byzantium, and the subject of subsequent commentaries. We still possess some sections:
Προγυμνάσματα – On rhetorical exercises (progymnasmata).
Περὶ στάσεων – On legal issues
Περὶ εὑρέσεως – On the invention of arguments
Περὶ ἰδεῶν – On various kinds of style (or On types of style)
On the method of forcefulness

In On Types of Style, Hermogenes identifies seven, rather than the traditional three—high, medium and low—elements of style. First is clarity, because of its importance. Clarity is subdivided into purity, which is sentence-level clarity, and distinctness, which is about overall organization. The next category, grandeur is subdivided into six parts, but generally clumped into four sections: solemnity and brilliance are the first section and are very similar. Solemnity is using short, abstract statements about elevated topics; brilliance takes those abstracts down to specifics, and is longer. The third part of grandeur is amplification. The last section of grandeur comprises three parts: asperity, vehemence and florescence. Asperity for sharp criticism, vehemence for disdain and florescence to ameliorate strong feelings. The category of beauty is not subdivided. The next type of style is rapidity—quick short sentence, rapid replied, sudden turns of thought in antithesis. The fifth style is ethos which is subdivided into simplicity, sweetness, subtlety and modesty. The last style, gravity, is the correct balance of all six of these types of style.

Editions and translations
Hermogenes was very popular in Byzantine education.  George of Trebizond, a Byzantine scholar, introduced Hermogenes to Western Europe during the Renaissance through his Rhetoricorum libri V (1470).  Trebizond´s handbook incorporates material from Hermogenes´ On Stases and On Types of Style with the anonymous Rhetoric to Herennius.  The famous publisher Aldus Manutius introduced the Hermogenean rhetorical corpus to the Western European reader in the Rhetores Graeci (1508).  Hermogenes is cited by Juan Luis Vives, and was influential on Johannes Sturm.  Sturm published translations and commentaries on most of Hermogenes´s works.  Hermogenes was also influential on Spanish rhetoricians such as Antonio Lull, Pedro Juan Núñez, and Luis de Granada.  Lull and Núñez published versions of Hermogenes's progymnasmata, and Núñez´s Rhetoricae institutionis draws significantly on the entire Hermogenic corpus.

The 19th century Hugo Rabe edition of the Opera Hermogenis, with Latin introduction, is based upon various editions, among others, the Aldine edition.

Michel Patillon has translated the entire Hermogenic corpus into French, with copious annotations.  Malcolm Heath has translated On Issues into English, and Cecil W. Wooten has translated On Types of Style into English.  A Dutch translation of On Types of Style appeared in late 2006.

Work on Hermogenes' influence
Mikael Johansson has tried to apply the unique rhetorical schemes of Hermogenes on some of the declamations of Libanius.

Annabel Patterson wrote a book about Hermogenean style, rhetorical categories, and its influence on Renaissance writers, such as William Shakespeare. Hugh Blair also mentions Hermogenes in his work on rhetoric.

Other people
There seems to have been yet another Hermogenes of Tarsus, remembered for being put to death by Emperor Domitian because of some allusions in his History.

References

External links
 Rhetores Graeci, L. Spengel (ed.), Lipsiae, sumptibus et typis B. G. Teubneri, 1854, vol. 2 pp. 1-18 and 131-456.

Roman-era Sophists
2nd-century writers
Ancient Greeks in Rome
Year of birth unknown
Year of death unknown
People from Tarsus, Mersin
Ancient Greek rhetoricians